Pentila amenaidoides is a butterfly in the family Lycaenidae. It is found in southern Cameroon, Gabon and the Democratic Republic of the Congo (from the northern part of the country to Isiro).

References

Butterflies described in 1893
Poritiinae
Butterflies of Africa